Elizabeth West may refer to:

 Elizabeth West, South Australia, a former suburb of Adelaide, South Australia
 Elizabeth H. West (1893–1948), American librarian and archivist
 Elizabeth West, author of Hovel in the Hills